Kunčice pod Ondřejníkem is a municipality and village in Frýdek-Místek District in the Moravian-Silesian Region of the Czech Republic. It has about 2,400 inhabitants.

Geography
Kunčice pod Ondřejníkem lies mostly in the Moravian-Silesian Foothills, the southern part extends into the Moravian-Silesian Beskids.

Sights
The Church of Saints Procopius and Barbara is a wooden church from the end of the 17th century. It was relocated here from the Subcarpathian Rus in 1931.

Gallery

References

External links

 

Villages in Frýdek-Místek District